Cody Ramsey (born 15 February 2000) is a professional rugby league footballer who plays as a er or  for the St. George Illawarra Dragons in the National Rugby League.

Career

Early life
Ramsey is of Macedonian and Indigenous descent.

Ramsey played his junior rugby league at Cabonne United.

2020 
Ramsey first appeared at the 2020 NRL Nines, where St. George Illawarra finished as runners-up. He finished the tournament as tied top try scorer with four tries as well as an appearance in the team of the tournament.

Ramsey scored two first-half tries, one on his first touch, in his first grade debut in round 18 of the 2020 NRL season for St. George Illawarra as they lost 8–37 against Canberra.

2021 
In the opening minute of the Round 21 match for St. George Illawarra against the Canberra Raiders, Ramsey had his two front teeth snapped after a head clash with team mate Andrew McCullough, forcing him to leave the field. 

Ramsey played a total of 18 matches for St. George Illawarra in the 2021 NRL season as the club finished 11th on the table and missed out on the finals.

2022
In round 24, Ramsey was sent to the sin bin during the clubs 24-22 victory over the Wests Tigers.
Ramsey played a total of 15 games for the club and scored six tries as they finished 10th on the table and missed the finals.

2023
Ramsey was ruled out of the entire 2023 season due to his ulcerative colitis illness which see him out for atleast 12 months.

Statistics

References

External links 
 Dragons profile

2000 births
Living people
Australian rugby league players
St. George Illawarra Dragons players
Rugby league fullbacks
Rugby league players from New South Wales
Rugby league wingers